Almost is a term in mathematics (especially in set theory) used to mean all the elements except for finitely many.

Almost may also refer to:

Songs
 "Almost" (Bowling for Soup song), 2005
 "Almost", by DNCE from DNCE, 2016
 "Almost" (George Morgan song), 1952
 "Almost (Sweet Music)", by Hozier, 2019
 "Almost", by Jewel from Freewheelin' Woman, 2022
 "Almost", by Orchestral Manoeuvres in the Dark from Orchestral Manoeuvres in the Dark, 1980
 "Almost", by Sarah Close, 2019
 "Almost", by Sarah Harmer from All of Our Names, 2004
 "Almost", by Soraya, a B-side of the single "Casi", 2003
 "Almost" (Tamia song), 2007
 "Almost", by Thomas Rhett from Center Point Road, 2019
 "Almost", by Tracy Chapman from Let It Rain, 2002

Other uses
 The Almost, an American Christian rock band
 Almost Skateboards, an American skateboard company

See also
 Approximation